Gilbert Browning (October 19, 1821 – 1882) was a Scottish-born merchant in Newfoundland Colony.

He was born in Newmilns, Ayrshire and came to Newfoundland after the Great Fire of 1846 to help rebuild the premises of Baine, Johnston and Company. Browning set up his own businesses soon afterwards, operating a cod oil refinery, sawmill and boat factory. He later set up the firm of G. Browning & Son which operated a bakery. He was also involved in mining.

Browning died during a visit to Glasgow for his health.

His son Donald served in the Newfoundland assembly.

Although the original premises of the company were destroyed by fire, G. Browning & Sons became one of the founding companies of Browning Harvey Limited, a beverage bottling company which is still in operation to this day.

References 

1821 births
1852 deaths
Businesspeople from Newfoundland and Labrador